Ronald Stewart Watt OBE is a Scottish master of Shotokan karate. He is the founder, president and chief instructor for the "National Karate Institute Scotland" a member of the World Karate Confederation (WKC).

Biography
Watt was born on 16 April 1947 in Aberdeen. He started learning karate in 1965, following a serious industrial accident which very nearly left him disabled. His interest in karate was inspired by the character Oddjob in the James Bond film Goldfinger.

In his 45-year career as a professional karate instructor, Watt has trained over 20,000 students.

On 25 May 2010, on behalf of the Emperor of Japan and the Japanese government, the Japanese Consul General in Edinburgh, Mr Masataka Tarahara, presented Ronnie Watt with the Order of the Rising Sun with Gold and Silver rays. This was in recognition of Mr Watt's outstanding contribution to karate and his commitment to strengthening the relationship between Scotland and Japan. Ronnie Watt is one of only a handful of Scots in history to be awarded this high honour.

Watt was appointed Officer of the Order of the British Empire (OBE) in the 2011 New Year Honours for services to karate.

In 2014, Watt was awarded a Commemorative Medal of the Trnava Self-Governing Region (TSGR) of Slovakia by the TSGR's president Tibor Mikuš. 
In 2015, Watt was made a Knight of the Order of the Holy Trinity. 
In 2015, Watt was made a Knight Commander Cavaleiro da Casa Real Portuguesa. 
In 2016, Watt was granted arms by the Lord Lyon, King of Arms in Scotland 
In 2019, Watt was awarded an Honorary master's degree from the University of Aberdeen  
In 2020, Watt was made a Member of the Order of St John.

Graduation history
Watt has been awarded the following dan gradings:  1st  - 1969; 2nd - 1972; 3rd - 1976; 4th - 1981; 5th - 1986; 6th - 1994; 7th - 1997.

8th dan was awarded in April 2005. The examiners for this grading were Dr Fritz Wendland (founding President of the WKC), Marko Nicovic (7th Dan Wado Ryu of the United Nations), Tomi Ochi (6th Dan Shotokan, Japan) Joe Mirza (8th Dan Shito Ryu, USA), Ladislav Klementis (8th Dan Gojo Ryu, Okinawa, Slovakia), Ilya Gouliev (7th Dan Shotokan, JKA Russia), Dave Friend (7th Dan Shotokan, South Africa)

9th dan awarded after evaluation November 2015 by Don Owens (9th Dan Shotokan, Canada), Charles Gidley (8th Dan Shotokan, England), Dr George Carruthers (8th Dan Shotokan, Scotland) and ratified by the Technical Committee of the International Shotokan-ryu Karate-do Shihankai (ISKS)

2003 WKC Director of Shotokan Karate 
2005 8th Dan Kyoshi, International Shotokan-Ryu Karate-Do Shihankai 
2006 Accepted Fellowship to International Shotokan-Ryu Karate-Do, Shihankai 
2010 Awarded Order of the Rising Sun with Gold and Silver Rays  
2010 8th Dan Hanshi, International Shotokan-Ryu Karate-Do Shihankai    
2015 Inducted into the European Martial Arts Hall of Fame    
2015 9th Dan Hanshi, International Shotokan-Ryu Karate-Do Shihankai

References

External links 
 Webpage NKI Scotland
Webpage 2010 Ministry of Foreign Affairs of Japan: Spring Conferment of Decorations on Foreign Nationals

1947 births
British male karateka
Karate coaches
Sportspeople from Aberdeen
Shotokan practitioners
Living people
Recipients of the Order of the Rising Sun, 5th class
Officers of the Order of the British Empire